The Career Achievement Award, also referred to as the Career Achievement Medal, is an award of the Volcanology and Igneous Petrology Division of the Geological Association of Canada. First awarded in 1993, it is given to scientists "in recognition of career achievements in the field of volcanology and/or igneous petrology".

Recipients
Source:

 1993 - W. Robert A. Baragar
 1994 - William H. Mathews
 1995 - Jack G. Souther
 1996 - T. H. Pearce
 1998 - J. Nicholls
 1999 - P. Roeder
 2000 - K. L. Currie
 2001 - Ron Emslie
 2003 - Don Francis
 2005 - Jaroslav Dostal
 2006 - Robert Kerrich
 2008 - Sandra M. Barr
 2009 - Don Baker
 2010 - Kelly Russell
 2011 - Georgia Pe-Piper
 2012 - John Stix
 2013 - Réjean Hébert
 2014 - not awarded
 2015 - not awarded
 2016 - Joseph Whalen
 2017 - Barrie Clarke
 2018 - Roger Mitchell
 2019 - Donald B. Dingwell
 2020 - John Greenough

See also

 List of geology awards
 List of geologists
 List of awards named after people

References

Canadian science and technology awards
Geology awards
Awards established in 1993